Doshman Ziari (also Romanized as Doshman Zīārī; also known as Doshman Zīādī and Dushman Zīāri) is a village in Banesh Rural District, Beyza District, Sepidan County, Fars Province, Iran. At the 2006 census, its population was 1,530, in 345 families.

References 

Populated places in Beyza County